Jongro Seojuk, or less known as Jongro Book Center, was the main center of book shopping in Seoul, Korea for many book fanatics over the decades. It opened in 1907 and declared bankruptcy in June 2002.  With a 95-year-old history, it was the place for university students, highschool students, anyone, looking for an opening of the mind came to Jongro Seojuk for solace. Jongro Seojuk became a famous rendezvous place for many people, where by the term "meet in front of Jongro Seojuk" became as commonplace as "meet in front of Seoul Station" It became the center of the literate and intellectually minded young people. It was even a famous meeting point among the non-literate.

History
It was started by the Church of the Message of Christ, in 1907, who bought a timber-built tile-roof house, first started off by selling books relating to Christianity, over the years it changed its name from Kyomoon Seogwan, Jongro Seogwan and in 1963, by adopting the name "Jongro Seojuk Center", it became the leading bookstore of Seoul. Slowly over the 1990s, the 300 strong employee base dwindled to a meager 50, and finally in 2002, not being able to reverse its $11.5 million deficit, it declared bankruptcy. It apparently looked for a third party buyer, but no one came to their rescue.

It declared bankruptcy in June 2002, right in the middle of the 2002 FIFA World Cup. The reasons for its bankruptcy were rumored being for its lack of parking space, introduction of internet book stores (this has little credence as other major book stores like Kyobo or Youngpoong has grown bigger every year), and general lack of customer service, the fact that one had climb through five different floors to look for a book, and its inadequate size. There was also voices criticising its flippant position of being so sure of its future, relying on old customers, being run by people who believed that Jongro Seojuk would survive. It cared nothing for the growing expansion of the new Kyobo Moongo which opened in 1981, it did not try to improve or change its image or store to match changing times. In essence, marketing failed, and customer-company relationship had become literally non-existent by the 1990s. It still managed to rake in a few loyal customers until the mid 1990s, but after 2000, Jongro Seojuk was overshadowed by the newer book stores in Jongro.

Centenary loss
The bankruptcy was quietly forgotten by many because of the World Cup, but millions of people remember the only book store that did not fail them if they looked for a book. After its bankruptcy, numerous people regretted the loss of the only cultural literary tradition in Korea that would have neared its centenary celebrations.

See also
List of bookstore chains

References

Bookstores of South Korea
Jongno District